Martin John McCague (born 24 May 1969) is a former professional cricketer who played for the England cricket team in three Test matches in 1993 and 1994. McCague was born in Northern Ireland and grew up in Australia where he began his professional career.

Career
His development as a cricketer started in Australia, where he grew up. He played first-class cricket for Kent County Cricket Club, who due to his Northern Ireland origins were allowed to field both him and an overseas player. 

His selection for England drew negative comments from some cricket commentators including John Woodcock in view of the fact that he had started his career in Australia. It was not just English fans who disliked this: during the 1994/5 Ashes in Australia, when he hailed a taxi, the Australian driver called him a traitor and refused to take him. He bowled well on debut, taking 4 for 121 in the first innings of the 1993 Trent Bridge Test, but enjoyed less success in the next Test as Headingley as Australia ran up 653 for 4 declared and won by an innings, thus retaining the Ashes. 

McCague had considerable pace but lacked control. With his experience of first-class cricket in Australia, his selection for England's Ashes tour of 1994/5 was not as surprising as is sometimes suggested. He started the tour well, taking 5 for 31 as England beat South Australia. But after England lost in the first Test at Brisbane, injured and out of favour, he played in no more of the first-class matches or any of the one-day internationals.

In 1994 McCague took 15 for 147 in a championship match against Derbyshire, including career best innings figures of 9 for 86, on his way to 57 wickets that season at 19.01. The following year he took 21 wickets in helping Kent to win the Sunday League. He continued to play county cricket for many years albeit intermittently. He played some Twenty20 cricket in 2005.

Personal life
McCague played one first team game for semi-professional Australian rules football team North Adelaide in 1990.

He has two children and as of 2018 plays for Leeds and Broomfield Cricket Club.

According to Steve Marsh's autobiography, McCague consumed 72 pints of Guinness during his stag weekend in Dublin.

References

External links

1969 births
Living people
England Test cricketers
Irish cricketers
Kent cricketers
Western Australia cricketers
People from Larne
Herefordshire cricketers
Cricketers from Northern Ireland